Ingen kan love dig i morgen is the third studio album by the Danish singer-songwriter Rasmus Seebach released on 4 November 2013 at ArtPeople label, as a follow-up to the hugely successful debut album Rasmus Seebach and the follow-up Mer' end kærlighed

The album received triple platinum certification in the first week of its release and hit the official Danish Singles Chart at No. 1 on week 46/2013 dated 22 November 2013. During 2013–2014, it has stayed at the top of the Tracklisten Albums Chart for 12 weeks at various intervals ranging from 22 November 2013 until 16 August 2014.

The album was the No. 1 album of 2014, the No. 8 album of 2015 and the No. 32 album of 2016.
The album spent more than 343 weeks in Denmark.

Track listing

Charts

Weekly charts

Year-end charts

Certifications

References

2013 albums
Danish-language albums
Rasmus Seebach albums